The 1990 Iowa State Senate elections took place as part of the biennial 1990 United States elections. Iowa voters elected state senators in half of the state senate's districts—the 25 odd-numbered state senate districts. State senators serve four-year terms in the Iowa State Senate, with half of the seats up for election each cycle. A statewide map of the 50 state Senate districts in the year 1990 is provided by the Iowa General Assembly here.

The primary election on June 5, 1990 determined which candidates appeared on the November 6, 1990 general election ballot. Primary election results can be obtained here. General election results can be obtained here.

The 1990 elections were the last in Iowa in which the Lieutenant Governor performed the duties of "President of the Senate." Starting on January 14, 1991, with the enactment of Article IV, section 18, of the Constitution of Iowa, the duties of Iowa's Lieutenant Governor no longer include presiding over the state Senate. The Majority Leader was instead the sitting Senate member who led the larger party. Following 1991, the President of the Iowa Senate would become a sitting member of the Senate.

Following the previous election in 1988, Democrats had control of the Iowa state Senate with 30 seats to Republicans' 20 seats.

To take control of the chamber from Democrats, the Republicans needed to net 6 Senate seats.

Democrats kept their control of the Iowa State Senate following the 1990 general election, with Democrats holding 28 seats and Republicans having 22 seats after the election (a net gain of 2 seats for the Republicans).

Summary of Results
NOTE: The 25 even-numbered districts did not have elections in 1990 so they are not listed here.

Source:

Detailed Results
Reminder: Only odd-numbered Iowa Senate seats were up for election in 1990; therefore, even-numbered seats did not have elections in 1990 & are not shown.

Note: If a district does not list a primary, then that district did not have a competitive primary (i.e., there may have only been one candidate file for that district).

District 1

District 3

District 5

District 7

District 9

District 11

District 13

District 15

District 17

District 19

District 21

District 23

District 25

District 27

District 29

District 31

District 33

District 35

District 37

District 39

District 41

District 43

District 45

District 47

District 49

See also
 United States elections, 1990
 United States House of Representatives elections in Iowa, 1990
 Elections in Iowa

References

1990 Iowa elections
Iowa Senate elections
Iowa State Senate